Escadrille 65 of the French Air Force was established during World War I. It was founded at Lyon-Bron Airport on 2 August 1915.

History
Though it was equipped with a mixed bag of aircraft, it was designated as Escadrille C 65 for its Caudron G.IVs. It was assigned to VII Armee of the French Army on 24 October 1915. It was re-equipped in its entirety with Nieuports, and was redesignated Escadrille N 65 on 21 February 1916. In June 1916, it was consolidated into an ad hoc Groupe de Combat that was based at Cachy. Other escadrilles within the Groupe were N3, N37, N62, N73, and N103. In early November 1916, Escadrille N65 was reassigned into Groupe de Combat 13. GC 13 also contained Escadrille N67, Escadrille N112, and Escadrille N.124.

On 5 December 1916, Escadrille N 65 received its first citation. As 1917 began, the escadrille was operating a mixture of Spad VIIs and Nieuport 17s. On 17 March 1917, the unit was detached from GC 13 to support VI Armee in the Second Battle of the Aisne. The escadrille rejoined GC 13 on 3 June 1917. In July, it moved to support the 1er Armee in Flanders. It was reassigned to II Armee on 11 August 1917. The following month, the escadrille moved once again, to support VI Armee. The flying unit's second citation came through on 16 November 1917, lauding them for downing 68 enemy aircraft and five observation balloons. This second citation entitled the unit's members to the fourragere of the Croix de Guerre.

The Summer of 1918 saw Escadrille 65 subsumed into ever larger units. GC 13 was consolidated into Escadre de Combat No. 2; it in turn was assigned to 1er Division Aerienne. The escadrille continued its valorous service. It was cited twice in September 1918, on the 10th and 19th. The unit's personnel won the right to wear the fourragere of the Medaille Militare. Escadrille 65 ended the war credited with 108 enemy aircraft destroyed.

Escadrille 65 continues its service in the current French Air Force.

Commanding officers
 Lieutenant Louis Gonnet-Thomas: 2 August 1915 - 1 May 1916
 Lieutenant Georges Boillot: 2 May 1916 - killed in an accident 17 May 1916
 Capitaine Philippe Fequant: 18 May 1916 - early November 1916
 Capitaine Emile Billon du Plan: early November 1916 - killed in an accident 29 April 1917
 Capitaine Lamy: 30 April 1917 - ca 23 January 1918
 Capitaine Louis Sejourne: 24 January 1918 - end of war

Notable personnel

 Lieutenant Charles Nungesser
 Sergente Jacques Gerard
 Sergente Paul Sauvage
 Sous lieutenant Eugene Camplan
 Adjutant Marcel Henriot
 Lieutenant Joseph De Bonnefoy
 Lieutenant Lucien Cayol
 Sous lieutenant Constant Plessis
 Capitaine Óscar Monteiro Torres (first Portuguese aviator to be killed in an air combat)

Aircraft
 Established with two Nieuport 11s, three Nieuport 12s, three Caudron G.IVs
 Nieuport 17s: January 1917
 Spad VIIs: January 1917

Duty stations
 Nancy, France
 Behonne, France: 24 February 1916
 Flanders

Endnotes

References 
 Franks, Norman; Frank W. Bailey. Over the Front: A Complete Record of the Fighter Aces and Units of the United States and French Air Services, 1914-1918 Grub Street, 1992. , .

Further reading 
 Bailey, Frank W., and Christophe Cony. French Air Service War Chronology, 1914-1918: Day-to-Day Claims and Losses by French Fighter, Bomber and Two-Seat Pilots on the Western Front. London: Grub Street, 2001.
 Davilla, James J., and Arthur M. Soltan. French Aircraft of the First World War. Stratford, CT: Flying Machines Press, 1997.
 Les escadrilles de l'aéronautique militaire française: symbolique et histoire, 1912-1920. Vincennes: Service historique de l'armée de l'air, 2004.

External links
Escadrille N 65 - SPA 65

Fighter squadrons of the French Air and Space Force
Military units and formations established in 1915
Military units and formations disestablished in 1918
Military units and formations of France in World War I
Military aviation units and formations in World War I